Kona Raghupathi is an Indian politician from Andhra Pradesh, India. He represents the Bapatla constituency in the Legislative Assembly of Andhra Pradesh. He was elected to serve as the Member of the Legislative Assembly (MLA) for Bapatla Assembly constituency in Andhra Pradesh, India, in 2014. He represents the YSR Congress Party.

Early life
Kona Raghupathi was born to Kona Prabhakara Rao, who was the former governor for Maharashtra and Sikkim states.

Political career

In 2014, he contested from Bapatla Assembly constituency on behalf of YSR Congress Party and emerged victorious over Annam Satish Prabhakar of Telugu Desam Party in the 2014 Andhra Pradesh Legislative Assembly election. In 2019, he won as the MLA from Bapatla constituency from Andhra Pradesh. He is the deputy speaker of the Andhra Pradesh Legislative Assembly.

References

Living people
Indian National Congress politicians from Andhra Pradesh
Andhra Pradesh MLAs 2014–2019
Andhra Pradesh MLAs 2019–2024
People from Guntur district
Year of birth missing (living people)
Deputy Speakers of the Andhra Pradesh Legislative Assembly
YSR Congress Party politicians